Jean Southern (born 14 January 1927) is a British actress. She primarily works in TV roles, though she appeared as the lady who operates the trolley in Harry Potter and the Philosopher's Stone. She is the oldest surviving actor from any of the Harry Potter movies.

Filmography

External links

British film actresses
British television actresses
Living people
21st-century British actresses
20th-century British actresses
Actors from County Durham
1927 births